Stephanie A. Young (born January 2, 1965) is an American Democratic politician from Michigan. She was elected to the Michigan House of Representatives from the 8th district in 2020.

Career 
Young graduated from Michigan State University.

References

External links 
 Official website

1965 births
Living people
Democratic Party members of the Michigan House of Representatives
Politicians from Detroit
African-American state legislators in Michigan
Women state legislators in Michigan
21st-century American politicians
21st-century American women politicians
Michigan State University alumni
African-American women in politics
21st-century African-American women
21st-century African-American politicians
20th-century African-American people
20th-century African-American women